Rodney Walker is a New Zealand former professional rugby league footballer who represented New Zealand in the 1972 World Cup.

Playing career
Walker played for the Papanui club in the Canterbury Rugby League competition. He was a Schoolboy Kiwi in 1964 and captained the New Zealand Colts in 1969 on a tour of New South Wales.

He represented Canterbury and Southern Zone. He played in 50 provincial games for Canterbury between 1968 and 1977, including 44 consecutive appearances. He was the first Canterbury player to reach the 50 mark and captained Canterbury in 1970.

Walker was selected for the New Zealand national rugby league team in 1969 and played in six test matches between 1969 and 1972, including at the 1972 World Cup.

In 1974 Walker played for the South Island against the touring Great Britain Lions.

As player-coach, Walker led Papanui to the 1975 and 1976 Canterbury championships.

References

Living people
New Zealand rugby league players
New Zealand national rugby league team players
Canterbury rugby league team players
South Island rugby league team players
Papanui Tigers players
Rugby league locks
New Zealand rugby league coaches
Year of birth missing (living people)